Cornel Pelmuș (11 September 1933 – 24 November 2017) was a Romanian fencer. He competed in the team sabre event at the 1960 Summer Olympics.

References

1933 births
2017 deaths
Romanian male fencers
Romanian sabre fencers
Olympic fencers of Romania
Fencers at the 1960 Summer Olympics
Sportspeople from Bucharest